Tyus Jackson (born November 22, 1983) is a former American football linebacker and coach. , he is the head coach of the Topeka Tropics in Champions Indoor Football.

Early life
Jackson attended Woodlawn High School where he was a four-year starter on the football and basketball teams. He played fullback, tight end and middle linebacker and was named All-Metro and Super All-Metro during his prep career. He was also the starting point guard on the basketball team and helped lead his squad to a 6A State Championship.

College career

Northeast Mississippi
He was ranked as a two-star prospect according to Rivals.com after two seasons at Northeast Mississippi Community College He lettered for two years at defensive end, playing for coach Bobby Hall. Selected to the Mississippi North All-State second team and was voted the defensive MVP in the Mississippi Junior College All-Star Game in 2002.

Memphis
In 2003, Jackson signed his letter of intent to play for Memphis, where he redshirted for the Tigers and began his Memphis career in 2004 when he had 13 tackles, 2.5 tackles for a loss, and one sack in 12 games, including a fumble recovery in the 2004 GMAC Bowl where Memphis lost to Bowling Green State University, 52–35.

In 2005, Jackson helped the Tigers to a 6–5 season and their second bowl win in three seasons when they beat the University of Akron in the 2005 Motor City Bowl. Jackson played in all 12 games for the Tigers in 2005 making 13 total tackles and one sack.

Professional career

af2
In 2007, Jackson played for the expansion Fort Wayne Fusion of af2, where he was coached by Eddie Brown.

In 2008, Jackson joined with the af2's Quad City Steamwheelers and earned Second Team All-af2 honors. The following year, he earned First Team All-af2 after leading the Steamwheelers with 12 quarterback hurries, 10 tackles for a loss, seven sacks and two safeties. He also added 41 total tackles, three forced fumbles and was named the Defensive Player of the Game in Week 1.

AFL
His performance from 2008–2009 in the af2 led to a contract in the Arena Football League (AFL) with the Milwaukee Iron for the 2010 season. In 2011, he signed to play with the Kansas City Command. Jackson was selected by the New Orleans VooDoo during the 2013 dispersal draft.

CIF
Jackson signed with the Salina Bombers of Champions Indoor Football (CIF) on February 25, 2015. Jackson signed with the Nebraska Danger of the Indoor Football League in March 2016.

References

1983 births
Living people
American football linebackers
Memphis Tigers football players
Fort Wayne Fusion players
Kansas City Command players
Quad City Steamwheelers players
Milwaukee Iron players
Milwaukee Mustangs (2009–2012) players
Chicago Rush players
New Orleans VooDoo players
Salina Bombers players
Nebraska Danger players
Champions Indoor Football coaches